Swiss Days is the name of an annual festival that takes place in three American towns with Swiss heritage, Berne, Indiana, Midway, Utah, and Santa Clara, Utah.

Notes

External links
 Bernes Swiss Days
 Midway Swiss Days 
 Santa Clara Swiss Days

Festivals in Indiana
Festivals in Utah
Cultural festivals in the United States
Swiss-American culture in Indiana
Swiss-American culture in Utah